Geetha Nagabhushan (25 March 1942 – 28 June 2020) was an Indian writer, novelist and academic, known for her works in Kannada. She became the first woman writer in Kannada to receive the Kendra Sahitya Academy Award for her novel "Baduku" in 2004.

She was first women president of kannada sahitya sammelana (Gadag).

Early life 
Geetha was born in 1942 in Savalagi to Shantappa and Sharanamma. She had 2 sisters and a brother. Her father, who was also a freedom fighter, worked in a cloth factory in Gulbarga.

Personal life 
Geetha married twice. Nagabhushan was her second husband with whom she had two children. After few years of marriage, Geetha was separated  and lived with children.

Literary works 
Geetha's most known writings are novels. She has also published short stories, research books and essays.

Novels 
 Thaavareya Hoovu
 Chandanada Chiguru
 Mahaamane
 Marali Mane
 Saptavarnada Swapna
 Maapura Thaayiya Makkalu
 Hasimamsa Mattu Haddugalu
 Aaghaatha
 Avaanthara 
 Chakkiya Hareyada Dinagalu
 Badalaaguva Bannagalu
 Neelaganga
 Preethisiddu Ninnanne
 Mohvaa
 Ninna Tholugalalli
 Ninnolavu Nanagirali
 Savati Srigandha
 Nanna Ninna Naduve
 Chitrada Haadu
 Dhummasu
 Erilithagalu
 Asaregalu
 Nanna Olavu Ninna Cheluvu
 Dange 
 Abhimana
 Baduku
 Kage Muttitu
 Baki
 Kappu Nela Kempu Hoovu
 Kaddumucchi

Story collections 
 Jwalantha
 Avva Mattu Ithara Kathegalu
 Kyadigi Banadaga Katheyagi Ninthavaru

Research works 
 Duruga Murugiyara Samskruthi
Dr. Geetha Nagabhushan's award winning novel, Baduku is now translated to English by Dr. Kusum Thantry and published by Kendra Sahitya Academy.

References

1942 births
2020 deaths
Indian feminist writers
Recipients of the Sahitya Akademi Award in Kannada
20th-century Indian women writers
20th-century Indian writers
Women writers from Karnataka